= Córdoba, Córdoba Province =

Córdoba, Córdoba Province may refer to:

- Córdoba, Argentina (in Córdoba Province, Argentina)
- Córdoba, Andalusia (in Córdoba Province, Spain)
